The 1994 Charlotte Rage season was the team's third season. Rage finished the season 5–7, losing in the quarterfinals of the AFL playoffs to the Arizona Rattlers.

Regular season

Schedule

Standings

Playoffs
The Sting were seeded sixth overall in the AFL playoffs.

Awards

References

Charlotte Rage seasons
1994 Arena Football League season
Charlotte Rage Season, 1994